The Universe Is Laughing is the third full-length album from Mayo and Wexford, Ireland folk-pop band The Guggenheim Grotto. It was originally released on June 15, 2010, by the New York-based indie label United For Opportunity.

Track listing 
"Trust Me I'm A Thief" - 3:56
"Map Of The Human Heart" - 3:54
"Wings And Feathers" - 3:53
"Never Before" - 2:54
"Concentrate" - 5:09
"Wisdom" - 3:35
"Ruby Heart" - 3:33
"Spiegel Song" - 3:25
"The Universe Is Laughing" - 3:07
"Diamond" - 3:00

External links
Official Website

2010 albums
The Guggenheim Grotto albums